Boyen may refer to:

 Govert Boyen (born 1977), Belgian football goalkeeper
 Guillaume Boyen (Willem Boy, 1520-1592), Flemish painter, sculptor, and architect 
 Hermann von Boyen (1771-1848), Prussian army officer
 Boyen Fortress, a former Prussian fortress located in the western part of Giżycko, in Warmian-Masurian Voivodeship, northeastern Poland

See also
 Boyens, a surname
 Yorck Boyen Insterburg, a former German association football club